Samuel Sawyer may refer to:

 Samuel Locke Sawyer (1813-1890), U.S. Representative from Missouri
 Samuel Tredwell Sawyer (1800-1865), U.S. Representative from North Carolina
 Happy Sam Sawyer, a Marvel Comics character